Crewkerne Grammar School was a grammar school in the town of Crewkerne in the English county of Somerset.

History
The school was founded in 1499 by John de Combe, a precentor of Exeter Cathedral and former vicar of Crewkerne, who had been born in the town. He and other later benefactors endowed the school with land and houses. In 1577, the
trustees of the school were "six of the most discreetest men in town". In the 17th century, the trustees gave other support to the poor of the town, lending money during the plague, buying fire buckets, and helping to fund the conversion of the bridewell into a workhouse.

The grammar school building in Abbey Street, immediately north of St Bartholomew's church, dates from 1636 and was used by the school until 1882.

It was reported in 1855 that by a recent order of the Court of Chancery the school was free to all sons of inhabitants living within six miles of Crewkerne "for instruction in Latin, Greek, and the principles of the Established Church". There were then four exhibitions for former pupils going on to the University of Oxford and three others, founded by Lord Wynford, each worth £25 a year for four years, of which two were for the universities of Oxford and Cambridge, the third for training in a learned profession. In 1870, John Marius Wilson noted that the school had an income from endowments of £320 a year.

In 1882, the school moved to new premises called de Combe House on Mount Pleasant. On the new site the school had a house system, and houses included Nelson (red), Blake (blue), Hardy (green), and Drake (yellow).

In 1904, after a prolonged financial crisis, the school was closed. In the following year, Wadham School, an ordinary Board of Education secondary school, was opened at de Combe House.

The old school building in Abbey Street is now the church hall of the nearby parish church of St Bartholomew's, and is a Grade II listed building. Most of the grammar school’s artefacts were acquired by the St Martins Preparatory School and were later moved to the town's museum. Many carved initials dating from the 19th century survive in the dado panelling of the Abbey Street building.

Notable former pupils
 James Mountford Allen (1809–1883), architect
 Charles Brooke (1829–1917), Rajah of Sarawak
 Thomas Hardy (1769–1839), captain of HMS Victory at the Battle of Trafalgar
 Marwood Munden (1885–1952), doctor and cricketer
 Matthew Warren (1642–1706), nonconformist minister and tutor
William Best, 1st Baron Wynford (1767–1845), Chief Justice of the Common Pleas

Masters of the grammar school
 1547 John Byrde
 1609–1613: Rev. James Wood
 1613–1637: Rev. John Ball
 1637–1645: Rev. Thomas Lambert M.A.
 1645: Rev. Josiah Tompkins
 1647: Mr. Jarvis Stipend
 1647: James Metford
 1838–1875: Rev. Charles Penny D.D.
 1883: Rev. Frederic Weller M.A.

St Martins Preparatory School
In 1939, at an early point in the Second World War, the St Martins School, an independent boarding school, moved to Crewkerne from Thames Ditton, Berkshire, making use of the former Grammar School properties in Abbey Street, the gymnasium and hall in the town, the building opposite the hall, de Combe House, Mount Pleasant, and Chard Road.

In 1940, St Martins acquired the Crewkerne Grammar School playing fields.

In the 1980s St Martins Prep School was in Abbey Street. In 2003, it became a pre-school only and was renamed St Martins Day Nursery & Pre-School. This closed in 2012.

Little is known in Crewkerne of the school’s origins before 1939, but it is believed it occupied the site of a current school which was newly established in 1946.

Heads of St Martins
 1964: Mr J. H.  Blackmore
 1976-1984: Lt. Col. Tony and Mrs Dowse-Brennan
 1984-1991: Mr and Mrs Murrell
 1991-2003 Julie Murrell

References

Crewkerne
Defunct schools in Somerset
Defunct grammar schools in England
Grade II listed buildings in South Somerset
Educational institutions established in the 15th century
1499 establishments in England
Educational institutions disestablished in 1904
1904 disestablishments in England